The Parti Gagasan Rakyat Sabah ( Sabah People's Ideas Party) or also registered as Parti Gagasan Bersama Rakyat Sabah (often known simply as GAGASAN or PGRS) and better known as Gagasan Rakyat, is a political party based in Sabah, Malaysia mainly to serve as a Sabah-based community and regionalist party. The party was formed and registered on 28 August 2013 as a multi-racial Sabah opposition party then with the vision to present the views and will of the original Sabahans to the government. It is only started to be active in 2016 and relatively little-known new party, initially registered as Parti Gagasan Bersama Rakyat Sabah (Parti BERSAMA), was among the latest new parties registration approved by the Registrar of Society (RoS) and just received permission to operate as a political party in 2013. This party is the main component of Gabungan Rakyat Sabah (GRS) since 9 December 2022.

History

The registration and the rise of the party 

This political party was formed and registered on 28 August 2013 by Dr. Ationg Tituh as a multi-racial Sabah opposition party then with the vision to present the views and will of the original Sabahans to the government. It is only started to be active in 2016 and relatively little-known new party, initially registered as Parti Gagasan Bersama Rakyat Sabah (Parti BERSAMA), was among the latest new parties registration approved by the Registrar of Society (RoS) under Societies Act 1966 constitution and also just received permission to operate as a political party in 2013.

An attempt to cooperate 

In March 2020, former GAGASAN president Dr. Ationg Tituh, Love Sabah Party (PCS) president Wilfred Bumburing, Sabah Native Co-operation Party (Anak Negeri) president Henrynus Amin and yet-to-be registered Parti Hak Sabah pro tem president James Ligunjang had signed a Memorandum of Understanding to unite the four parties as a new alliance under the existing GAGASAN party with Anifah Aman as the president. GAGASAN is to be renamed, while the three other parties are to be dissolved upon approval from the components’ respective supreme councils according to the plan. However the planned Sabah opposition front merger fizzles out after GAGASAN and Anak Negeri withdraw to pursue their own party agenda as the supposed merger president Anifah had joined PCS and was elected as PCS president instead in July 2020 before the snap state election.

Takeover by former Sabah Bersatu leaders 

On 29 January 2023, Hajiji Noor announced to lead Parti Gagasan Rakyat Sabah (PGRS). He said PGRS will be used to continue the struggle as a local party in Sabah. PGRS was also accepted by the GRS coalition as a component party on December 9, 2022.

The member of parliament for Papar, Armizan Mohd. Ali said four former BERSATU Sabah members of parliament will not join Parti Gagasan Rakyat Sabah because of the anti-hopping law. Instead, they will remain as direct members of Gabungan Rakyat Sabah (GRS).

On 5 February  2023,  Hajiji Noor has officially taken over Parti Gagasan Rakyat Sabah (PGRS) following the party’s Extraordinary General Meeting (EGM).

On 21 February 2023, Yusof Yacob, along with other 8 MLAs support Hajiji. At the same time, Yusof Yacob, James Ratib, Jasnih Daya, Arshad Bistari, Hamid Awang, Mohammad Mohamarin, Ben Chong and Norazlinah joined PGRS.

List of leaders 

President

Leadership structure

The official leadership of the GAGASAN Party 

 President:
 Hajiji Noor
 Deputy President:
 Masidi Manjun
 Vice-President:
 Mohd. Arifin Mohd. Arif
 Rubin Balang
 Masiung Banah
 Women Chief:
 Redonah Bahanda
 GAGASAN Women Youth Chief:
 Emmie M. Idang
 GAGASAN Youth Chief:
 Fairuz Renddan
 Secretary-General:
 Mohd Razali Razi
 Deputy Secretary-General:
 Stephen Jacob Jimbangan
 Treasurer-General:
 Ghulam Haidar Khan Bahadar
 Deputy Treasurer-General:
 Tahir Picho

 Information Chief:
Nizam Abu Bakar Titingan
 Supreme Council Members:
 Japlin Akim
 Isnin Aliasnih
 Jaffari Waliam
 Abdul Ghani Mohd Yassin
 Samad Jambri
 Ruddy Awah
 Hassan A Gani Pg Amir
 Limus Jury
 Jaafari Waliam
 John Ambrose
 Bobbey Ah Fang Suan
 Mohd Basri A Gafar
 Sotijin Juhui
 Maksit Saidi
 Abdul Karim Abdul Wahid
 Abdul Hakim Gulam Hassan
 Faisyal Yusof Hamdain Diego
 Arsit Sedi
 Awang Kadin Tang
 Maijol Mahap

Logo and Flag 
The main colors used in the Gagasan Rakyat's logo and flag are Red and Blue. Gagasan Rakyat always uses Red and Blue as the party theme because Red symbolizes the Courage of the people to demand the rights of Sabah while the color Blue symbolizes the Unity of the people of Sabah.

Elected representatives

Dewan Negara (Senate)

Senators

Dewan Negara (Senate) 

 His Majesty's appointee:
 John Ambrose
 elected by the Sabah State Legislative Assembly:
 Bobbey Ah Fang Suan

Dewan Undangan Negeri (State Legislative Assembly) 

Sabah State Legislative Assembly

GAGASAN state governments

State election results

See also 
Pemuda Parti Gagasan Rakyat Sabah
Politics of Malaysia
List of political parties in Malaysia

External links

References 

Political parties in Sabah
Political parties established in 2013
2013 establishments in Malaysia